Swami Ramanand Teerth Rural Government Medical College is a state medical institution in Ambajogai, district Beed, Maharashtra. It is the first rural medical college in Asia. It is commonly known as SRTR GMC Ambajogai. Dr. V.K. Dawale, FRCS was the founding dean. The first batch of 50 students was admitted in July 1975 and graduated in 1979.

The post-graduate courses in various subjects were also started with the permission of Government of Maharashtra and Medical Council of India. The first post-graduates came out in 1981. In 1998, the bed strength of hospital was increased to 500. As of today almost all the disciplines run the post-graduate courses which are recognized by the Medical Council of India.

Departments

1) Department of Anatomy

2) Department of Anesthesiology

3) Department of Biochemistry

4)Department of Forensic Medicine

5)Department of Medicine

6)Department of Microbiology

7)Department of Obstetrics and Gynaecology

8)Department of Ophthalmology

9)Department of orthopedics

10)Department of Pathology

11)Department of pediatrics

12)Department of pharmacology

13)Department of physiology

14)Department of psychiatry

15)Department of radiology

16)Department of Social and preventive Medicine

17)Department of Surgery

18)Department of otorhinolaryngology

19)Department of dermatology

Infrastructure
A large silver jubilee celebration was held in 2000. A new college building was completed in 2008, and the dean's office, pre- and para-clinical departments have been shifted in the new building. A new residents Hostel of 124 rooms was completed in 2009 and provides accommodation to the resident doctors since January 2010. A new hospital building (medical unit) was completed in 2007, and Paediatrics, the Intensive Care Unit, and Medicine have been shifted there. Construction for a 230-bed surgical unit) is completed.

Alumni
 Dr. Madhavrao Kinhalkar

External links
 

Medical colleges in Maharashtra
Beed district
Affiliates of Maharashtra University of Health Sciences